Vaccines for the New Millennium Act was a bill introduced by Senator John Kerry (D-MA) and Rep. Nancy Pelosi (D-CA) in the 107th Congress in 2001. The bill would have provided tax credits to private sector companies working on vaccines for some of the world's most deadly infectious agents.  The tax credits took the form of a 30 percent credit on qualified research and development expenditures related to a set of diseases including HIV, tuberculosis, and malaria among others.  The chief Congressional staff assistants on this legislation were James Matthew Jones for Senator Kerry and Chris Collins for Representative Pelosi. On April 25, 2001, the bill was referred to the Subcommittee on Health, and no further action was taken on it thereafter.

External links
 on THOMAS

Proposed legislation of the 107th United States Congress
Proposed legislation of the 109th United States Congress
United States proposed federal health legislation
United States proposed federal taxation legislation